Pilate is a commune in the Plaisance Arrondissement, in the Nord department of Haiti. It has 40,445 inhabitants.

References

Populated places in Nord (Haitian department)
Communes of Haiti